This page lists the World Best Year Performance in the year 1988 in both the men's and the women's race walking distances: 10 km, 20 km and 50 km (outdoor). The main event during this season were the Olympic Games in Seoul, South Korea.

Abbreviations
All times shown are in hours:minutes:seconds

Men's 20 km

Records

1988 World Year Ranking

Men's 50 km

Records

1988 World Year Ranking

Women's 5 km

Records

1988 World Year Ranking

Women's 10 km

Records

1988 World Year Ranking

References
maik-richter
alltime-athletics

1988
Race Walking Year Ranking, 1988